Miroslav Bogosavac (born 14 October 1996) is a Serbian professional footballer who plays as a left-back for Russian club Akhmat Grozny.

Club career
Born in Sremska Mitrovica, Bogosavac joined the youth academy of Partizan from Sirmium in 2008. He signed his first professional contract with the club on 14 August 2013, alongside Miladin Stevanović, penning a three-year deal. In order to gain experience, the duo was immediately assigned to affiliated team Teleoptik. They were both promoted back to Partizan in the 2015–16 campaign, with Bogosavac playing regularly under manager Ivan Tomić in the second half of the season.

In February 2017, Bogosavac was transferred to Čukarički on a three-year contract. He was selected in the 2017–18 Serbian SuperLiga Team of the Season due to his performances in the process.

On 14 February 2020, he joined Russian Premier League club Akhmat Grozny on loan until the end of the 2019–20 season, with an option to purchase. On 3 July 2020, Akhmat activated their purchase option and signed a 4-year contract with Bogosavac.

International career
Bogosavac represented Serbia at under-19 and under-21 level in UEFA competitions. He made his debut for Serbia national football team on 20 March 2019 in a friendly against Germany, as a starter.

Statistics

Honours

Club
Partizan
 Serbian Cup: 2015–16

Individual
 Serbian SuperLiga Team of the Season: 2017–18, 2018–19

Notes

References

External links
 
 
 
 
 

Association football defenders
FK Čukarički players
FK Partizan players
FK Teleoptik players
FC Akhmat Grozny players
Sportspeople from Sremska Mitrovica
Serbia under-21 international footballers
Serbia youth international footballers
Serbia international footballers
Serbian First League players
Serbian footballers
Serbian expatriate footballers
Expatriate footballers in Russia
Serbian SuperLiga players
Russian Premier League players
1996 births
Living people